Johann "Hans" Kleer (born 4 September 1969) is an Austrian professional football manager and former player who is the manager of Austrian Regionalliga club FCM Flyeralarm Traiskirchen. He has previously managed clubs including Wiener SC, Floridsdorfer AC and Austria Lustenau.

References

External links
Hans Kleer at Footballdatabase

1969 births
Living people
Austrian footballers
Austrian football managers
FK Austria Wien players
FC Admira Wacker Mödling players
First Vienna FC players
SC Austria Lustenau players
Wiener Sport-Club managers
SV Horn managers
SC Austria Lustenau managers
Association football defenders
Floridsdorfer AC managers